Conway Pretorius (born 4 July 1992 in Pretoria, South Africa) is a South African rugby union player for  in the Currie Cup and in the Rugby Challenge. His regular position is number eight.

Career

Youth

Pretorius was born in Pretoria, but grew up in Strand in the Western Cape. After high school, he joined the Harmony Sports Academy in Virginia, where he also got involved with the  side, playing in all their matches during the 2011 Under-19 Provincial Championship Division B competition and helped the Griffons win the title by beating the  team in the final in Wellington.

He was again an ever-present in the  side that finished second on the 2013 Under-21 Provincial Championship log and lost in the final to the  side in Nelspruit. Pretorius scored five tries during the competition, including a brace against .

Boland Cavaliers

In 2014, he graduated to the ' Vodacom Cup side. In just his second first class match, Pretorius scored a hat-trick of tries in a 15-minute spell during the first half of the match to help his side secure a 24–19 victory over Kenyan invitational side . He retained his spot in the run-on side for the remainder of the competition, making five appearances in total.

Griquas

Pretorius joined Northern Cape side  on a two-month deal for the 2014 Currie Cup qualification competition.

Perugia

At the start of 2015, Pretorius joined Italian Serie A side Perugia. However, he left after just half a season with the side.

Kelso

Pretorius then moved to Scotland where he joined Scottish National League Division One side Kelso.

References

South African rugby union players
Living people
1992 births
Rugby union players from Pretoria
Boland Cavaliers players
Griquas (rugby union) players
Rugby union number eights